Kaori Oguri (小栗香織 Oguri Kaori; born 14 September 1970 in Chigasaki, Kanagawa Prefecture, Japan) is a Japanese actress.

External links

JMDb Profile 
Fan!Fan!Fan! Oguri Kaori 

1970 births
Living people
Japanese actresses
People from Chigasaki, Kanagawa